I'll Eat You Last: A Chat with Sue Mengers is a 2013 American one-act play by John Logan, about the talent agent Sue Mengers.

Productions 
The debut 2013 American production starred Bette Midler. The play, which cost $2.4 million to produce, was a hit.

The Australian premiere of the play was a new Melbourne Theatre Company production in October 2014, starring Miriam Margolyes as Mengers and directed by Dean Bryant.

Chinatown controversy 
In the play, Mengers claims that Jane Fonda turned down the role of Evelyn in the 1974 film Chinatown, which ended up being a defining role for Faye Dunaway. In 2013, Fonda responded by saying that director Roman Polanski had never really offered her the part, and that it was written for Dunaway.

References

External links 
New York Times review
Review by Liz Smith at Huffington Post
Review by Rex Reed
Review at Hollywood Reporter
Official website

2013 plays
Broadway plays
American plays
One-act plays